Mierzanowo  is a village in the administrative district of Gmina Grudusk, within Ciechanów County, Masovian Voivodeship, in east-central Poland.

Notable people 
 Ignacy Mościcki (1867–1946), President of Poland

References

Villages in Ciechanów County